Cynthia Huntington is an American poet, memoirist and a professor of English and Creative Writing at Dartmouth College. In 2004 she was named Poet Laureate of New Hampshire.

Life and career

Huntington has published numerous books of poetry, including Heavenly Bodies (Southern Illinois University Press, 2012), a finalist for the National Book Award. She has published poems in numerous literary journals and magazines including TriQuarterly, The Michigan Quarterly Review, Harvard Review, Cimarron Review, AGNI, Ploughshares, and Massachusetts Review, and in anthologies including The Best American Erotic Poems: From 1800 to the Present (Sribner, 2008) and Contemporary Poetry of New England (Middlebury College Press, 2002).

She was born in Meadville, Pennsylvania, and received her M.A. from The Bread Loaf School of English at Middlebury College.  She is Professor of English and Creative Writing at Dartmouth College.

Awards and honors
2004 Poet Laureate of New Hampshire.
2012 National Book Award (Poetry), finalist, Heavenly Bodies

Huntington has received grants from the New Hampshire State Council on the Arts, The Fine Arts Work Center in Provincetown, and the Massachusetts Cultural Council, as well as two fellowships from the National Endowment for the Arts. Other awards include: the Robert Frost Prize from The Frost Place in Franconia, New Hampshire, the Jane Kenyon Award in Poetry, and the Emily Clark Balch Prize.

Works 
Poetry
Terra Nova (Southern Illinois University Press, 2017)
Fire Muse: Poems from the Salt House (Dartmouth College Press, 2016)
 Heavenly Bodies (Southern Illinois University Press, 2012)
 The Radiant (Four Way Books, 2003, winner of the Levis Poetry Prize)
 We Have Gone to the Beach (Alice James Books, 1996, winner of the Beatrice Hawley Award)
 The Fish-Wife (University of Hawaii Press, 1986, Pacific Poetry Series Comp Winner)

Prose
 The Salt House: A Summer on the Dunes of Cape Cod (University Press of New England, 1999)

References

External links
 Four Way Books Website > Cynthia Huntington > Author Page
 Alice James Books Website > Cynthia Huntington > Author Page
 Graywolf Press > Real Sofistikashun by Tony Hoagland > Excerpt discussing Huntington's work
 Poem: Orion Magazine > January/February 2010 Issue > All Wet and Shine by Cynthia Huntington
 Poems: terrain.org: A Journal of the Built & Natural Environments > No. 26 Fall/Winter 2010 > Three Poems by Cynthia Huntington
 Ploughshares > Authors & Articles > Cynthia Huntington

American women poets
Poets Laureate of New Hampshire
Middlebury College alumni
Dartmouth College faculty
American academics of English literature
Living people
Writers from Pennsylvania
Writers from Vermont
National Endowment for the Arts Fellows
American memoirists
People from Orange County, Vermont
American women memoirists
Year of birth missing (living people)
American women academics
21st-century American women